Ritchie Valens is the debut album by American musician Ritchie Valens. It was released by Del-Fi Records in January 1959. It is his only studio album entirely composed of master tracks recorded at Gold Star Studios in Los Angeles. The album peaked at #23 on the Billboard album chart.

The LP yielded four U.S. chart singles:  "Come On, Let's Go" (#42), "Donna" (#2), "La Bamba" (#22), and "That's My Little Suzie" (#55).

The original pressings are black and sea green with circles around the outer edge. The print font for the track listings on these labels is the same font used on the back of the album cover. Later pressings feature black labels with gold and sea green diamonds around the outer edge. The album has been reissued over the years, featuring different album covers.

Track listing
All songs written by Ritchie Valens, except where indicated.
Side 1
"That's My Little Suzie" (Valens, Robert Kuhn) – 1:52
Original album covers show the title as "I Got A Gal Named Sue", corrected on later pressings
"In a Turkish Town" – 2:16
"Come On, Let's Go" – 2:00
"Donna" – 2:28
"Boney-Moronie" (Larry Williams) – 2:46
"Ooh, My Head" – 1:48
Side 2
"La Bamba" (Traditional; adapted by Ritchie Valens) – 2:06
"Bluebirds Over the Mountain" (Ersel Hickey) – 1:45
"Hi-Tone" (Al Hazan) – 2:06
"Framed" (Jerry Leiber, Mike Stoller) – 2:13
"We Belong Together" (Robert Carr, Johnny Mitchell, Hy Weiss) – 1:57
"Dooby-Dooby-Wah" (Valens, Kuhn) – 1:53

Charts

Album

External links

Del-Fi Records albums
Ritchie Valens albums
1959 debut albums
Albums recorded at Gold Star Studios